Anjali Gopalan  is an Indian human rights and animal rights activist, founder and executive director of The Naz Foundation (India) Trust, an NGO dedicated to the fight against the HIV/AIDS epidemic in India mainly focused on women and children. Anjali began working on issues related to HIV/AIDS and marginalized communities in the United States. In 2012, Time magazine placed Gopalan on its list of the 100 most influential people in the world.

Early life

Anjali Gopalan was born on the 1 september of 1957 in Chennai, Tamil Nadu. Her father, Group Captain Dr KR Gopalan, was an officer in the Indian Air Force and her Punjabi mother a homemaker. Anjali did her schooling in La Martiniere Lucknow.

She studied in both India and the US, and her degree in political science from Lady Shri Ram College for Women, a postgraduate diploma in journalism, and a Masters in Politics (with specialization in International Politics) from School of International studies, Jawaharlal Nehru University.

Social work

Early work
Anjali worked for nearly a decade with community-based organizations in New York City where she worked for migrants from South-East Asia who lacked valid documents. She later started the Naz Foundation that changed the lives of LGBT and women's and children those who live with HIV positive. Providing direct services for HIV/AIDS and Marginalization issues. Circumstances led her to live and care HIV affected undocumented migrant labor, schoolchildren, and South Asian communities.

1990s

When Anjali returned to India, She established Delhi's first HIV clinic in 1994 and the Naz Foundation (India) Trust, an HIV/AIDS service organization that concentrates on prevention and care. The foundation currently works on issues of sexuality rights.

2000s

In 2000, she opened the country's first holistic home cares for orphaned vulnerable HIV+ children and Women. She trains health professionals and care-givers to treat HIV+ children, and recognizes that existing facilities need to expand their scope to include them. She has designed a system that provides multi-faceted care to infected children, both in the home and in foster care.

Her main concern remains in providing quality care to those living with the HIV infection, which she has done through founding and managing a care home for HIV-positive children and women. As a strong advocate for the sexual health and rights of the LGBT community, she spearheaded the eight-year legal battle against Section 377 of the Indian Penal Code (IPC). In 2001, her organization filed a Public Interest Litigation (PIL) to decriminalize homosexuality and put an end to the archaic law under which individuals were harassed and discriminated against based on their sexual orientation. The Delhi High Court ruled in favour of Naz India in 2009 and declared Section 377 an infringement on individual rights.

In 2001, she was awarded the Commonwealth Award for her work with the marginalized communities. The Chennai-based Manava Seva Dharma Samvardhani presented her the Sadguru Gnanananda Award in 2003, for her work in supporting those living with HIV/AIDS.

In March 2007, Gopalan was honored as a Woman Achiever by the Ministry of Women and Child Development, along with nine other awardees. She was felicitated by Sri Somnath Chatterjee, speaker of the Lok Sahba, in the presence of Minister of State for Women and Child Development. On 29 July 2012, Gopalan inaugurated the Alan Turing Rainbow festival and flag offed the Asia's first genderqueer pride parade as a part of the Turing festival organised by Gopi Shankar Madurai of Srishti Madurai this was the first gay pride parade attended by Gopalan. Since 2 September 2012, she has served as the advisory head of the committee of Srishti Madurai.

In 2012, Gopalan established an animal sanctuary called "All Creatures Great and Small" at Silakhari, Harayana.  

On 25 October 2013, Gopalan was awarded the Chevalier de la Legion d'Honneur in the order of the legions of Honor, the highest award from France presented to her by Najat Vallaud-Belkacem, Minister of Women's Rights for France. Gopalan is the first Indian Tamil woman awarded with "Legion of Honour".

In 2014, the Limca Book of Records placed Anjali Gopalan in "People of the Year".

Actor Nutan Surya played the role of Anjali in Aligarh released in 2016.

Awards and recognition 

 Received the Chevalier de la Legion d'Honneur (2013)
 Ms Gopalan was named one of Time magazine's 100 Most Influential People in the World (2012)
 Received the Woman Achiever Award from the Government of India (2007)
 Received the Commonwealth Award (2001)

Anjali Gopalan Srishti Awards for Social Justice Journalism
The academic committee of Srishti Madurai awards the Anjali Gopalan Srishti Awards for Social Justice Journalism to distinguished social journalists. The first award was received by V. Mayilvaganan and V. Narayanswamy from The Times of India for highlighting issues of genderqueer and Santhi Soundarajan.

References

1957 births
Indian LGBT rights activists
People from Chennai
Living people
Chevaliers of the Ordre des Arts et des Lettres